Roberto Aguire (born 1988) is a Mexican actor and producer. His first major film role was in the 2012 film Struck by Lightning, in which he played the character of Emillio. In 2014, he starred opposite Robin Williams as a troubled young street hustler named Leo in the film Boulevard.

Personal life
Aguire was born in Mexico City to Mexican parents and was subsequently raised in Switzerland before going on to study at Georgetown University and New York University's Tisch School of the Arts. As of 2013, he resides in Los Angeles.

Filmography

Film

Television

References

External links

Living people
Actors from Geneva
Tisch School of the Arts alumni
Swiss male film actors
21st-century Mexican male actors
1988 births
Mexican male film actors
Mexican male television actors
Male actors from Mexico City
Mexican emigrants to Switzerland
Mexican expatriates in the United States